Claude Gillot (April 27, 1673 – May 4, 1722) was a French painter, print-maker and illustrator, best known as the master of Watteau and Lancret.

Life
Gillot was born in Langres.  He was a painter, engraver, book illustrator, metal worker, and designer for the theater. He had Watteau as an apprentice between 1703 and 1708.

Gillot's sportive mythological landscape pieces, with such titles as Feast of Pan and Feast of Bacchus, opened the Academy of Painting at Paris to him in 1715; and he then adapted his art to the fashionable tastes of the day, and introduced the decorative fêtes champêtres, in which he was afterwards surpassed by his pupils, though Gillot's examples usually lack the contemporary dress of Watteau's. His paintings often include characters from the commedia dell'arte, a taste he passed on to Watteau. Gillot was also closely connected with the opera and theatre as a designer of scenery and costumes.  He died in Paris, aged 49.

Gallery

References
References

Further reading

General studies
 
 
 
 
 
Specialty studies
 
 
 
 
 
 
 
 
 
 
Additional studies
 
 
 
 
Reference books

External links

Brief biography of Claude Gillot from the Getty Museum
 

1673 births
1722 deaths
People from Langres
17th-century French painters
French male painters
18th-century French painters
18th-century French male artists